The 1906 Miami Redskins football team was an American football team that represented Miami University during the 1906 college football season. Led by coach Arthur H. Parmelee in his first year, Miami compiled a 1–5–1 record, being outscored 16 to 55.

Schedule

References

Miami
Miami RedHawks football seasons
Miami Redskins football